Kraken is a Spanish comics series, written by Antonio Segura and drawn by Jordi Bernet, first published in the magazine Metropol in 1983. The stories are centered on protagonist Lieutenant Dante, a policeman in a dystopic society patrolling the violent sewers of the fictional city Metropol.

Publication history

As one of the flagship comics series to appear in the Spanish magazine Metropol, founded by an artist group to achieve greater creative freedom, it was staged in a city bearing the magazine's name, similar to other comics native to the publication. As the magazine's run proved short-lived and was forced to shut down, the series continued its run in Zona 84. Initially published in black and white, later album issues were released in colour.

The stories are presented in relatively short episodes, and feature concentrated violence, claustrophobic settings and little sentimentality. There are also occasional appearances of characters who bear resemblance to real-life actors (such as Orson Welles' character in Touch of Evil and Max von Sydow's character in The Exorcist).

Characters
Lieutenant Dante leads a sewer patrol unit, in its efforts to hunt down the Kraken and combat the criminal activity that flourishes in the underground maze of tunnels.
The GAS patrol,  the Subterranean Action Group, who make up Dante's soldiers. A police unit with an extremely high mortality rate.
The Kraken, the antagonist monster, is almost a mythical character, by horrific reputation and rare appearances.

Notes

References

 Kraken publications in Métal Hurlant BDoubliées 
 Kraken albums Bedetheque 

Spanish comics
Science fiction comics